Mary Elizabeth Southwell Dudley Leathley (18 June 1818 – 22 December 1899), was a prolific Irish writer of children's books and religious works.

Biography
Leathley was born Mary Elizabeth Southwell Dudley on 18 June 1818 in Clonmel, Co. Tipperary. Her father was George Dudley and the family were members of the Society of Friends. Leathley was first published at sixteen and became a prolific writer. She focused on children's fiction and religious works. One of her stories sold a half million copies. Leathley married a barrister William Henry Leathley on 11 June 1847. He was catholic and Leathley converted the same year. Their son, Dudley, was raised Catholic. After living in Midhurst, Ascot and Malvern Leathley died in Hastings on 22 December 1899. Leathley's works were usually anonymous and very little is known about her life; her identity as the author was given by Lawrence Darton.

Works
 Chickseed Without Chickweed (1861)
 Children of Scripture: A Sunday School Book for Youth (1866)
 The Story of Stories (1875)
 Requiescent: A Little Book of Anniversaries (1888)

Sources

1818 births
1899 deaths
19th-century Irish women writers
19th-century Irish writers
Irish religious writers
Irish women children's writers
People from Clonmel
Pseudonymous women writers
Women religious writers
19th-century pseudonymous writers